SuperKarts is a kart racing video game developed for MS-DOS by Manic Media in 1995.

Plot
The player plays as characters from different countries and races on circuits from those characters' home countries.

 Kevin Moore 
 Charlie Smith 
 Klaus Krugel 
 Aki Sun 
 Katie Clark 
 Luis Sanchez 
 Mustapha Gee 
 Ivan Zoomski

Tracks

Every driver has a home track according to the country of origin. Each of these tracks has two variants. This means that the game features 16 race tracks and one bonus track

  - Los Angeles: Sandy track, sunny weather.
  - London: Asphalt track, cloudy weather.
  - Berlin: Covered with factory metal pipes and asphalt, driven in darkness.
  - Tokyo: The tracks resembles a huge digital screen, driven at night.
  - Ayers Rock: Mainly clay surface, the tracks is partly die Strecke wird gelegentlich von großen Wasserlachen gestört, driven in darkness.
  - São Paulo: Mainly grass surface, partly sand and wood, rainy weather.
  - Delhi: The surface changes between grass, sand and water, bright weather.
  - Moscow: The surface changes between cobblesstones, ice and snow, snowy weather.

Bonus track:

  - Krakatau: The surface changes between mainly stones, partly there's a viscous substance, maybe lava, the skies are crimson as lava.

Reception
In the United Kingdom, the game topped the monthly all-formats sales chart in April 1995. Computer and Video Games said it is a Super Mario Kart lookalike that is "not as good as that seminal piece of software, but damn good fun with up to eight players on a network." Next Generation gave the game four stars out of five, and stated that "SuperKarts offers a perfect blend of strategy and arcade action."

Reviews
Pelit (Jun, 1995)
Electric Playground (Nov 17, 1995)
Coming Soon Magazine (Jul 25, 1995)
PC Team (Apr, 1995)
Imperium Gier (Oct 10, 1998)

References

1995 video games
DOS games
DOS-only games
Kart racing video games
Virgin Interactive games
Video games developed in the United Kingdom